Fivemile Creek is a  long tributary to East Branch Oil Creek in Crawford County, Pennsylvania.

Course
Fivemile Creek rises on the Shirley Run divide about 2 miles east-northeast of Buell Corners, Pennsylvania.  Fivemile Creek then flows north and then west through Fish Flats and the Erie Drift Plain to East Branch Oil Creek.

Watershed
Fivemile Creek drains  of area, receives about 45.7 in/year of precipitation, has a topographic wetness index of 453.06 and is about 62% forested.

References

Additional Maps

Rivers of Pennsylvania
Rivers of Crawford County, Pennsylvania